Schenkel is a subway station on Rotterdam Metro lines A and B, and is situated in the northeastern part of Rotterdam, in the borough Prins Alexander. The station is named after a neighbourhood in nearby Capelle aan den IJssel, situated to the southeast of the subway station.

This station was opened on 28 May 1983 when the East-West Line (also formerly the Caland line) was extended from its previous terminus Capelsebrug. Note that this section uses overhead wires to provide traction power.

At Schenkel station, passengers can transfer to RET-busline 37.

Rotterdam Metro stations
Railway stations opened in 1983
1983 establishments in the Netherlands
Railway stations in the Netherlands opened in the 20th century